The Confederate Monument is a Confederate memorial in Fort Payne, Alabama, in the United States. The monument was installed in 1913, "erected through the efforts of the Sons and Daughters of the Confederacy, with the assistance of other interested citizens. The monument was originally located in the center of town and was moved to its present location at a later time. .

See also

 Confederate Monument (Camden, Alabama)
 Confederate Monument (Ozark, Alabama)
 Confederate Monument (Troy, Alabama)
 List of Confederate monuments and memorials

References

1913 establishments in Alabama
Buildings and structures completed in 1913
Buildings and structures in DeKalb County, Alabama
Confederate States of America monuments and memorials in Alabama
Outdoor sculptures in Alabama